John Hubert Macey Rodgers   (9 October 1915 – 10 January 1997) was a Missionary bishop. He was Vicar Apostolic of Tonga and Niue (1953–1966) Bishop of Tonga (1966–1973) then Bishop of Rarotonga (1973–1977), Auxiliary Bishop of Auckland (1977–1985), Superior of the Mission, Funafuti, Tuvalu (1986).

Biography
Rodgers was born in Upper Hutt, New Zealand, on 9 October 1915. After receiving his secondary education at St Patrick's College, Wellington and St Patrick's College, Silverstream, he studied to be a Marist priest at Mt St Mary's Seminary, Greenmeadows.

He was professed in the Society of Mary (Marists) in 1936 and was ordained a priest on 15 December 1940. A year later he went to Tonga and was principal of 'Api Fo'ou College. In 1953 he was appointed Vicar Apostolic of Tonga and was consecrated bishop in St Mary of the Angels, Wellington. Rodgers attended Sessions 1, 3 and 4 of the Vatican II Council.

He became Bishop of Tonga when Tonga was created a diocese in 1966. He resigned the see in 1972 to make way for an indigenous bishop Bishop Patrick Finau.  He became Bishop of Rarotonga in 1973. Among his achievements in the Cook Islands, he founded Nukutere College in 1975.

After his resignation  from that see, he was appointed Auxiliary Bishop of Auckland to assist Bishop John Mackey.

In the 1979 New Year Honours, Rodgers was appointed a Companion of the Order of St Michael and St George, for services as Roman Catholic bishop in Tonga and the Cook Islands. In 1985 he was appointed superior of the Catholic mission of Funafuti, Tuvalu and Secretary of the Episcopal Conference of the Pacific, but retired to Auckland in 1986 because of ill health.

Death
He died on 10 January 1997, aged 81. He was buried on 14 January 1997 at Kalevalio Cemetery, Ma'ufanga, Tonga.

Notes

References
 
 Bishop John Hubert Macey Rodgers SM, Catholic Hierarchy website (accessed 15 February 2011)

1915 births
1997 deaths
Cook Island Roman Catholic bishops
20th-century Roman Catholic bishops in New Zealand
New Zealand Roman Catholic missionaries
People educated at St. Patrick's College, Wellington
People educated at St. Patrick's College, Silverstream
Participants in the Second Vatican Council
People from Upper Hutt
Marist Brothers
Religious leaders from Auckland
Roman Catholic missionaries in Tonga
Roman Catholic missionaries in the Cook Islands
Roman Catholic missionaries in Tuvalu
New Zealand people of Irish descent
Roman Catholic bishops of Tonga
New Zealand Companions of the Order of St Michael and St George
New Zealand expatriates in Tonga
New Zealand expatriates in Tuvalu
Roman Catholic bishops in the Cook Islands
Roman Catholic bishops of Rarotonga